Mary River is a waterway in the U.S. state of Alaska. Situated on the northwestern portion of Seward Peninsula, it was included in the Agiapuk River mining district.

About  from its mouth, the river forks, the two branches being of about equal size. The lower part of the course of the Mary River is within the flats which border Imuruk Basin. Above these flats, the valleys of the two branches of the Mary River are wide, and within them, the rivers meander over broad flood plains. At the edge of the Imuruk lowlands, where the Mary River enters them, there are gravel bluffs and isolated gravel buttes. These bluffs and buttes are remnants of a higher gravel plain. On the ridge between the forks of the Mary River, there are two low, rocky buttes, which, on account of the general low relief of the region, stand out as landmarks. These buttes are composed of white crystalline limestone, whose bedding is obscured by jointing and cleavage. Except for these buttes, the bed rock, as indicated by fragments found on the surface, consists of calcareous mica schists. The Kuzitrin slates form a broad belt of dark schistose quartzites between the Mary River and the Kuzitrin at Mary's Igloo. About the heads of the two branches of the Mary River, the bed rock consists of calcareous and graphitic schists similar to those on Igloo and Budd creeks, tributaries of the American River. Little bed rock is exposed on the Mary River. Gold is not known to have been found on this river.

References

Rivers of Alaska
Rivers of Nome Census Area, Alaska
Rivers of Northwest Arctic Borough, Alaska
Rivers of Unorganized Borough, Alaska
Rivers of the Seward Peninsula